Old Homestead Records was a record label based in Michigan specializing in preserving and reissuing recordings of traditional country and bluegrass artists.

History
John W. Morris launched Old Homestead Record company in 1971 to release new and archival recordings by country singer and banjoist Wade Mainer.

Sublabels included Broadway Intermission, Collectors Series, and Rutabaga Records.

On Broadway Intermission, Morris released Bing Crosby's 1945 "Seventh Air Force Tribute" to vinyl from transcripts of a World War II Armed Forces Radio broadcast. Broadway Intermission also released music by Tommy Dorsey,
Bix Beiderbecke, The Mills Brothers, and others.

Artists (selective)
 Lee Allen and the Dew Mountain Boys
 The Anglin Brothers
 Emry Arthur
 Bobby Atkins, Frank Poindexter, and Tony Rice
 The Bailes Brothers (Johnnie & Homer)
 Charlie Bailey and The Happy Valley Boys with The Osborne Brothers
 Billy Baker
 The Barrier Brothers
 Lulu Belle and Scotty
 Blue Denim
 Blue Grass Roy
 Chris Bouchillon
 The Carolina Tar Heels
 The Carter Family
 Helen Carter
 Lew Childre
 The Coon Creek Girls
 Vernon Dalhart
 The Delmore Brothers
 The Dixie Gentlemen and Tut Taylor
 The Dixon Brothers
 The Girls of the Golden West
 Lonnie Glosson
 Bill Grant and Delia Bell
 G. B. Grayson and Henry Whitter
 Sid Harkreader
 Roy Harvey
 The Hilltoppers
 Clint Howard
 Joe Isaacs, Frank Wakefield, and Richard Greene
 Jewell Mountain Grass
 Bradley Kincaid
 The Jake Landers Family
 Mike Lilly and Wendy Miller
 McGee Brothers (Sam and Kirk)
 Uncle Dave Macon
 Wade Mainer
 Patsy Montana
 Charlie Moore and the Dixie Partners with Bill Napier
 The Marksmen
 Joe Meadows
 Charlie Monroe's Boys
 Clyde Moody
 Molly O'Day
 Original Lonesome Pine Fiddlers
 The Potomac Valley Boys
 Riley Puckett
 Eugene "Red" Rector
 Carson J. Robison
 Ramblin' Tommy Scott and Curly Seckler
 Red Smiley and the Bluegrass Cut-Ups
 Emma Smith
 The Southern Showboys
 Larry Sparks
 Spider Bridge
 The Stanley Brothers
 Ernest Stoneman
 Don Stover and the White Oak Mountain Boys
 Carl Story and the Rambling Mountaineers with The Brewster Brothers
 The Sunrise Bluegrass Boys
 The Sunnysiders
 The Tobacco Tags
 Frank Welling and John McGhee
 Whitey & Hogan with The Briarhoppers
 Rual Yarbrough and The Dixiemen

See also 
 List of record labels

References 

American record labels
American independent record labels